Saint-Séverin is a parish in the Beauce-Centre Regional County Municipality in Quebec, Canada. It is part of the Chaudière-Appalaches region and the population is 300 as of 2021. It is named after Reverend Édouard-Séverin Fafard, founder of the parish in 1864.

Demographics 

References

Parish municipalities in Quebec
Incorporated places in Chaudière-Appalaches